Hutson is the third album recorded by R&B singer Leroy Hutson on Curtis Mayfield's Curtom record label. The album was to become the start of a creative peak for Hutson, and together with Feel The Spirit and Hutson II, marked him as one of Soul music's most talented and engaging artists.

Track listing 
All tracks composed by Leroy Hutson; except where indicated
"All Because of You"  7:03	 	
"I Bless the Day"     4:03   
"It's Different"      4:43	
"Cool Out" (Leroy Hutson, Michael Hawkins)           3:00 	
"Lucky Fellow" (Leroy Hutson, Charles Boyd, Gerald Dickerson)        5:03 	
"Can't Stay Away" (Leroy Hutson, Michael Hawkins)    5:35 	
"So Much Love"        3:22

Personnel 
Leroy Hutson - arranger, Fender Rhodes, piano, synthesizer, lead vocals
Janice Hutson - spiritual advisor
Roger Anfinsen - engineer
Sol Bobrov - string conductor
Ronald Coleman - keyboards
Victor Chandler - bass 
Richard Fegley - album cover, photography
Master Henry Gibson - congas
Donnell Hagan - Clavinet, drums, percussion
Michael Harris - trumpet
Stephen Harris - guitar
Kitty Haywood Singers - backing vocals
John Janus - engineer
Bill McFarland - trombone
Beverly McLin   - backing vocals
Craig McMullen - guitar
Jim Schubert - art director
Joseph Scott - bass 
Rich Tuto    - arranger
Phil Upchurch - acoustic and electric guitars
Jerry Wilson - tenor and alto saxophone

Charts

Singles

References

External links 
 Leroy Hutson - Hutson LP at Discogs.

1975 albums
Leroy Hutson albums
Curtom Records albums